Gymnacranthera maliliensis is a species of plant in the family Myristicaceae. It is endemic to Sulawesi in Indonesia.

References

Myristicaceae
Endemic flora of Sulawesi
Trees of Sulawesi
Near threatened flora of Asia
Taxonomy articles created by Polbot
Plants described in 1986